Anthony Saidy (born May 16, 1937) is an International Master of chess, a retired physician and author. He competed eight times in the U.S. Chess Championship, with his highest placement being 4th. He won the 1960 Canadian Open Chess Championship.  The same year, he played on the U.S. Team in the World Student Team Championship in Leningrad, USSR. The U.S. team won the World Championship, the only time the U.S. has ever won that event.

Saidy is the author of several chess books, including The Battle of Chess Ideas, and The World of Chess (with Norman Lessing). His most recent book, 1983, a Dialectical Novel, is a work of "what if" political fiction inspired by Saidy's four sojourns in the USSR, during which he was able to get to know Russians from all walks of life in both public and intimate settings. Harrison Salisbury, Pulitzer Prize-winning Moscow correspondent of the New York Times, said that it had the "ring of truth."

As an older mentor he befriended Robert James Fischer (Bobby Fischer). It was in Saidy's family home in Douglaston, Long Island that Fischer secluded himself prior to the World Chess Championship 1972. Saidy and others successfully encouraged the apparently reluctant Fischer to go to Iceland, where he won the world crown in a match against holder Boris Spassky.

Saidy is the son of playwright Fred Saidy.

Books
1967 U.S. Open Chess Championship : Atlanta, Georgia (with L. Dave Truesdel Jr), International Chess Imports, 1967
The World of Chess (with Norman Lessing), Random House, 1974
The Battle of Chess Ideas, RHM, 1975
The March of Chess Ideas, McKay, 1994
1983: A Dialectical Novel, Seagull Press, 2013

External links

 

1983, a Dialectical Novel

American chess players
Physicians from New York City
Chess International Masters
American non-fiction writers
American fiction writers
1937 births
Living people
American chess writers
American people of Lebanese descent
American male non-fiction writers
People from Douglaston–Little Neck, Queens
Sportspeople of Lebanese descent